The following is a list of the 427 games that were available on the Virtual Console for the Wii in North America. These games could also be played on the Wii U through Wii Mode, but lack the additional features found in Wii U Virtual Console releases. The games are sorted by system and in the order they were added in the Wii Shop Channel. To sort by other categories, click the corresponding icon in the header row.

Nintendo discontinued the Wii Shop Channel on January 31, 2019 worldwide (with the function to add Wii Points and purchase and play VC games and/or WiiWare being permanently removed on March 26, 2018). But as of February 1, 2019, Wii Shop Channel users can still continue to redownload previously purchased content and/or transfer Wii data over to a Wii U (via the Wii U Transfer Tool --if purchased from the Wii Shop Channel).

Titles

Nintendo Entertainment System 
There were 94 titles available from the Nintendo Entertainment System, which was launched in 1985.

Super Nintendo Entertainment System
There were 74 titles from the Super Nintendo Entertainment System, which was launched in 1991.

Nintendo 64
There were 21 titles available from the Nintendo 64, which was launched in 1996.

TurboGrafx-16/TurboGrafx-CD 
There were 63 titles available from the TurboGrafx-16 (HuCARD and CD-ROM² variants), which was launched in 1989.

Sega Master System
There were 16 titles available from the Sega Master System, which was launched in 1986.

Sega Genesis
There were 75 titles available from the Sega Genesis, which was launched in 1989.

Neo Geo
There were 54 titles available from the Neo Geo, which was launched in 1990.

Commodore 64
There were only 9 titles available from the Commodore 64, which was launched in 1982. All games from this micro-computer were removed from the service in August 2013.

Virtual Console Arcade
There were 21 arcade titles available.

See also
List of Virtual Console games for Wii U (North America)
List of Virtual Console games for Nintendo 3DS (North America)
List of WiiWare games
List of WiiWare games (North America)

References

Virtual Console games for Wii
Virtual Console games for Wii